Dierks Bentley is the debut studio album by American country music singer Dierks Bentley. It was released on August 19, 2003, throug Capitol Records Nashville. It produced three singles with "What Was I Thinkin'", "My Last Name", and "How Am I Doin'". The first one became Bentley's first number one hit on the US Billboard Hot Country Singles & Tracks (now Hot Country Songs) chart. The album sold 1.1 million copies in the US.

The track "My Love Will Follow You" was originally recorded by Buddy Miller on his 1995 album Your Love and Other Lies. "Bartenders, Etc." and "Whiskey Tears" were originally featured on Bentley's independently released 2001 album Don't Leave Me in Love, and were re-recorded for this album.

Track listing

Chart performance

Weekly charts

Year-end charts

Singles

Certifications

Personnel
Dierks Bentley – lead vocals
Steve Brewster – drums
Jimmy Carter – bass guitar
Shad Cobb – fiddle
J. T. Corenflos – electric guitar
Rusty Danmyer – steel guitar
Glen Duncan – fiddle
Terry Eldredge – background vocals
Lona Heins – background vocals
Wes Hightower – background vocals
Mike Johnson – steel guitar, Dobro
Randy Kohrs – Dobro
James Mitchell – electric guitar
Russ Pahl – steel guitar, banjo
Steven Sheehan – acoustic guitar
Bryan Sutton – acoustic guitar, banjo, mandolin
Russell Terrell – background vocals

The Del McCoury Band (Track 13)
Mike Bub – upright bass
Jason Carter – fiddle
Del McCoury – acoustic guitar, background vocals
Rob McCoury – banjo
Ronnie McCoury – mandolin, background vocals

References

2003 debut albums 
Albums produced by Brett Beavers
Dierks Bentley albums
Capitol Records Nashville albums